Fenes is a village in Bodø Municipality in Nordland county, Norway. The village is located on the south side of the island, where the majority of the island residents live. It is the location of Landegode Church.

References

Bodø
Villages in Nordland
Populated places of Arctic Norway